The Newark and New York Railroad was a passenger rail line that ran between Downtown Newark and the Communipaw Terminal at the mouth of the North River (Hudson River) in Jersey City, bridging the Hackensack River and Passaic River just north of their mouths at the Newark Bay in northeastern New Jersey. The Central Railroad of New Jersey operated it from its opening in 1869. Though operations ended in 1946; portions remained in use until 1967.

History 
Opened on July 23, 1869 and operated by the Central Railroad of New Jersey (CNJ), the railroad provided a direct route between Newark and its Jersey City terminal, where passengers could transfer to ferries to New York. The line cost $300,000 per mile, unprecedented at the time, earning it the sobriquet "the country's costliest railroad". In 1872 a connection south was added at a junction called Newark Transfer to Elizabeth, where it joined the railroad's main line, which crossed Newark Bay at Bayonne on the predecessor of the CRRNJ Newark Bay Bridge. The line was built partially to relieve overcrowding and reduce the travel time taken on the New Jersey Railroad line to Exchange Place on the Hudson River waterfront.

The route travelled west from the Hudson and crossed Bergen Hill where a cut had been excavated for a right of way (ROW).  It then crossed the Hackensack to Kearny Point, the tip of a larger peninsula formally known as New Barbadoes Neck, to the Passaic River. The bridges across the rivers were raised in 1913 to accommodate shipping. Upon crossing the Passaic River, it entered the Ironbound Section of Newark at Ferry and St. Francis Streets, traveling parallel to and south of Market Street until it crossed Ferry Street again between Union and Prospect Streets. From there, the line crossed over the Pennsylvania Railroad (PRR) tracks and terminated at Broad Street. At its peak over 100 passenger trains used the route daily.

After a boat collided with the Hackensack Drawbridge in 1946 causing severe damage, the through line was discontinued, and the bridge was dismantled. Passenger trains from both Newark and Elizabethport continued utilizing the PD Draw over the Passaic to Kearny to serve a Western Electric plant on Kearny Point until the Aldene Plan was implemented in 1967.

The piers of the Hackensack bridge are still visible (at ) from the shoreline along the proposed Hackensack RiverWalk. Several open-deck spans of the Passaic River swing bridge, and its main pier (though not the swing span itself), remain (at ).  While the Newark terminal building is still standing and is part of the Four Corners Historic District the trackage and train shed which served it are now the site of the Prudential Center. The rail yard is site of the proposed Triangle Park. The bridges from the yard over McCarter Highway, the PRR tracks now used by Amtrak/New Jersey Transit (NJT) to Newark Penn Station, and New Jersey Railroad Avenue still exist. A station house at the Jackson Avenue station survived until at least 2007.

The ROW through Bergen Hill and West Side in Jersey City has become part of the Hudson Bergen Light Rail. NJT has announced plans for 0.7 mile extension of the West Side Branch from its current terminus at West Side Avenue Station over Route 440 to a redevelopment area known as Bayfront, where a new station would be constructed.

Service

See also
 Newark Plank Road
 Timeline of Jersey City area railroads
 List of stations on the Central Railroad of New Jersey
 List of bridges, tunnels, and cuts in Hudson County, New Jersey
 List of ferries across the Hudson River to New York City
 Park Place (H&M station)

References

External links
1931 aerial view of the rail line through Ironbound Section of Newark
Newark and New York Branch
Central Railroad of New Jersey, Jersey Central Railroad
Interior photograph of Newark terminal
interior photograph of Newark terminal

Central Railroad of New Jersey
Railroad bridges in New Jersey
Transportation in Hudson County, New Jersey
Transportation in Newark, New Jersey
History of Newark, New Jersey